Zoltán Sebescen (Hungarian: Sebestyén Zoltán) (born 1 October 1975) is a German former professional footballer who played as a right-back or right winger.

Club career
Sebescen was born in Ehingen. He started his career at Stuttgarter Kickers, where he played at a senior level from 1994, in the Regionalliga Süd, and from, in 1996 the 2. Bundesliga. In 1999, he transferred to Bundesliga side VfL Wolfsburg and then in 2001 to Bayer Leverkusen. With Bayer, Sebescen played in the 2002 UEFA Champions League Final, losing to Real Madrid. In 2003, he had to undergo several knee surgeries, due to problems caused by lyme disease. Having not been able to play for years, Sebescen announced his early retirement, aged 29, on 16 August 2005. He had played 72 times in the Bundesliga, scoring 13 times, and 52 times in the 2. Bundesliga, scoring 5 times.

International career
Sebescen became the first VfL Wolfsburg player to earn a cap for the Germany national football team when he played in a friendly against the Netherlands in Amsterdam in February 2000. Being placed in an unaccustomed right-back position, he produced a dismal performance against Dutch winger Boudewijn Zenden and was substituted at half time. He subsequently was not called up again.

Coaching career
In July 2007, he started working as youth coordinator for his first club Stuttgarter Kickers.

Personal life
On 31 October 2019, 44-year old Sebescen returned to the pitch, signing for German amateur club TV Unterboihingen. Since his retirement in 2005, Sebescen had only played old-boys football, among others for his former club Bayer Leverkusen. Sebescen had worked together with Unterboihingen's manager Daniel Zeller's brother, Philipp, at the sporting goods company Decathlon. Sebescen got his debut for Unterboihingen on 1 December 2019.

External links

References

1975 births
Living people
People from Ehingen
Sportspeople from Tübingen (region)
German people of Hungarian descent
German footballers
Germany international footballers
Germany B international footballers
Association football defenders
Stuttgarter Kickers players
VfL Wolfsburg players
Bayer 04 Leverkusen players
Bundesliga players
Footballers from Baden-Württemberg
West German footballers